Costa Rica participated at the 2017 Summer Universiade, in Taipei, Taiwan with 8 competitors in 4 sports.

Competitors
The following table lists Colombia's delegation per sport and gender.

Athletics

Fencing

Swimming

Taekwondo

References

Nations at the 2017 Summer Universiade